Abraham Hyatt Smith (February 5, 1814October 16, 1892) was an American lawyer, Democratic politician, and Wisconsin pioneer.  He was the 5th Attorney General of the Wisconsin Territory, the 2nd United States Attorney for the District of Wisconsin, and the first mayor of Janesville, Wisconsin.  In historical documents his name is almost always abbreviated as A. Hyatt Smith.

Biography

Born in New York City, Smith studied law and was admitted to the New York bar in 1835. In 1842, he moved to Janesville, Wisconsin Territory, where he built a mill and practiced law. Smith served as a delegate to the first Wisconsin Constitutional Convention of 1846 as a representative of Rock County.  In 1847, Wisconsin Territorial Governor Henry Dodge appointed Smith as the Attorney General of the Territory serving until Wisconsin became a state in 1848. In 1848, President James Polk appointed Smith as the United States District Attorney serving until 1849. In 1853, Smith was elected first Mayor of Janesville after its incorporation as a city. He later served as Mayor again in 1857. He was also involved with the railroad industry and other forms of communication. For some years, he was Regent for the University of Wisconsin at Madison.

References

|-

Politicians from New York City
Politicians from Janesville, Wisconsin
Mayors of places in Wisconsin
Wisconsin Democrats
New York (state) lawyers
Businesspeople from Wisconsin
United States Attorneys for the District of Wisconsin
Wisconsin Attorneys General
1814 births
1892 deaths
19th-century American politicians
Lawyers from New York City
19th-century American businesspeople
19th-century American lawyers